Radio Songs, Radio Song and The Radio Song may refer to:

 Radio Songs (chart), chart released weekly by Billboard magazine
 "Radio Song", fourth single released by R.E.M. from their 1991 album Out of Time
 Radio Songs (album), an album of duo Robin and Linda Williams
 Radio Songs: A Best of Cold Chisel (1985), second greatest hits collection by Australian pub rock band Cold Chisel
 "The Radio Song" (New Found Glory song), demo on the album New Found Glory by the American rock band of the same name
 "The Radio Song" (Joe Walsh song), by the guitarist for the Eagles
 "Radio Song" (Jet song), from Jet's album Get Born
 "The Radio Song", a song by Dillard & Clark from their 1968 album The Fantastic Expedition of Dillard & Clark